Henry King PC (I) (18 February 1733 – 23 February 1821) was an Anglo-Irish politician.

King sat in the Irish House of Commons as the Member of Parliament for Boyle between 1761 and the constituency's disenfranchisement in 1800. In 1770 he was made a member of the Privy Council of Ireland.

References

1733 births
1821 deaths
18th-century Anglo-Irish people
Irish MPs 1761–1768
Irish MPs 1769–1776
Irish MPs 1776–1783
Irish MPs 1783–1790
Irish MPs 1790–1797
Irish MPs 1798–1800
Henry
Members of the Privy Council of Ireland
Members of the Parliament of Ireland (pre-1801) for County Roscommon constituencies